Fagioli is an Italian surname literally meaning "beans". Notable people with the surname include:

Alice Fagioli (born 1980), Italian sprint canoeist
Federico Fagioli (born 1991), Argentine politician
Luigi Fagioli (1898–1952), Italian motor racer
Nicolò Fagioli (born 2001), Italian footballer

See also
Pasta e fagioli
27959 Fagioli, a main-belt asteroid 

Italian-language surnames